Lars Frederiksen and the Bastards is the eponymous debut studio album by the American punk rock band Lars Frederiksen and the Bastards. It was released on March 20, 2001 via Hellcat Records. The album peaked at #26 on the Independent Albums and #49 on the Heatseekers Albums.

All of the songs were written by lead singer/guitarist Lars Frederiksen and his Rancid bandmate Tim Armstrong, with the exception of two covers, Billy Bragg's "To Have and to Have Not" and Eddie Holland's "Leavin Here". "Campbell, CA" borrows the melody from white power skinhead band Skrewdriver's version of "Tomorrow Belongs to Me", which originally appeared in the album Hail the New Dawn.

The song "Dead American" was used by wrestler Vampiro as his entrance music on his independent circuit.

Track listing

Personnel

 Lars Frederiksen - songwriter, vocals, lead guitar, rhythm guitar, slide guitar
 Jason Woods - bass
 Gordy Carbone - backing vocals
 Scott Abels - drums, percussion
 Tim Armstrong - songwriter, additional guitar (track 11), producer, mixing engineer
 Dave Carlock - mixing engineer
 Gene Grimaldi - mastering
 Jesse Fischer - artwork
 Meagan Frederiksen - photography
 Brody Dalle - front cover photo
 Alicia Burwell - back cover photo

Charts

Release history

References

External links 

2001 debut albums
Hellcat Records albums
Lars Frederiksen and the Bastards albums